The Frank LaVerne Buck House, located at 581 Pine Ave. in Pacific Grove, California, is a historic house that is listed on the National Register of Historic Places. Also known as the Pacific Grove Inn, it was built in 1904.

It was the home of city civic leader Frank LaVerne Buck (1849-1931), a native Midwesterner who was involved in the dairy and egg businesses. The home is historically important as the only known surviving example of the work of local architect Robert C. Gass, and is one of only a few well-preserved Victorian houses in Pacific Grove. The front staircase and other woodwork in the house was completed by carpenter C.E. Hovey, who is known for craftsmanship in the area.  Among its prominent exterior components is the fenestration, which features leaded glass and Palladian windows.

Built at the junction of Pine and Forest avenues, the house is a prominent component of its neighborhood's built environment. As a large building constructed in a combination of the Colonial Revival and the late Queen Anne styles, it dominates both cross streets.

It was listed on the National Register of Historic Places in 1986.  In 2020, the building was a bed and breakfast with 16 rooms.

References

External links
Pacific Grove Inn, official website

Houses on the National Register of Historic Places in California
Houses on the National Register of Historic Places in Monterey County, California
Queen Anne architecture in California
Houses completed in 1904
Houses in Monterey County, California
National Register of Historic Places in Monterey County, California